Jain Agamas (Digambara), texts of Digambara Jainism
Jain Agamas (Śvētāmbara), texts of Jainism based on the discourses of the tirthankara, as per Shwetambar Jainism 
 Āgama (Buddhism), a collection of scriptures
 Agam Regency, a regency of West Sumatra, Indonesia
 Yaacov Agam, an Israeli artist
 AGAM, the Israeli Defence Forces Directorate of Operations
 Agam (band), a Bangalore-based band

See also 
 Agama (disambiguation)
 Agame, a historical region of Ethiopia
 Agham (disambiguation)
 Jain Scriptures